Baron Gaston van de Werve et de Schilde (22 March 1867 – 18 August 1923) was a Belgian Roman Catholic politician. He was governor of the province of Antwerp from 16 December 1912 until his death on 18 August 1923 .

He was the son of baron Henri van de werve et de Schilde, and of Jeanne de Béthisy. He married Françoise de la Boëssière-Thiennes, daughter of the Marquess Gaston de la Boëssière-Thiennes, and of the countess Louise de Lannoy.

Political career
Gaston van de Werve et de Schilde was a member of the Antwerp provincial council for the canton Zandhoven from 5 July 1893 until 16 December 1912.

Honours 
 Commander Legion of Honour.
 Knight grand cross in the Order of Saint Gregory the Great.
 Order of pope Pius X.

References

Sources
 Steve Heylen, Bart De Nil, Bart D’hondt, Sophie Gyselinck, Hanne Van Herck en Donald Weber, Geschiedenis van de provincie Antwerpen. Een politieke biografie, Antwerpen, Provinciebestuur Antwerpen, 2005, Vol. 2 p. 199

1867 births
1923 deaths
Governors of Antwerp Province
Gaston
People from Antwerp Province
Knights Grand Cross of the Order of St Gregory the Great
Belgian Roman Catholics